Airborne Athletics, Inc., is a private designer, manufacturer, marketer, and wholesaler of basketball and volleyball training equipment. The company manufactures one volleyball training machine, two volleyball training products, and two basketball training machines that are sold for high schools, colleges and universities, professionals, fitness centers, and training facilities, and home training.

History
Airborne Athletics, Inc. was formed by the two brothers,  Doug and Jeff Campbell, to produce training tools using Consistent Air Technology (CAT) (patent #6,659,893). The original name of the company was Volleyball Products International, changing to their current name in 2000.

They began with a volleyball machine in 1996, creating the first version known as the SetPro 2000. The AirCAT training machine replaced it in the year 2001.

The Dr. Dish is a basketball machine using the same technology. It was introduced in 2003 and is labeled as a game simulation machine, providing players the opportunity to practice game-like situations with game-like passes.

Many aspects of the Dr. Dish carried over to another basketball machine called iMake, introduced in 2007. Where Dr. Dish simulates and trains players in every facet of the game including shooting, rebounding and defense, iMake focuses on perimeter shooting.

These machines help basketball and volleyball youth athletes train harder and at game speed. iMake, and AirCAT.

Volleyball
The AirCAT training machines are battery operated and simulate volleyball sets, passes, serves, and spikes.

NetworKs, is a portable, stand-alone net training station that catches and collects volleyballs.

Block ‘N Cover attaches to a regular net and provides the opportunity to practice hitting around blocks.

Airborne Athletics, Inc.’s volleyball equipment has been “Exclusively Approved and Endorsed by USAV” and Airborne’s products have been designated the “Official Volleyball Training Machine” and “Official Volleyball Capturing Net System for USAV”. 

The AirCAT is used by universities, high schools, and training facilities from around the world.

Basketball
Dr. Dish is a game simulation machine in addition to a traditional shooting machine. It uses a net collection system when under the basket that collects 90% of made or missed shots. Dr. Dish can also provide bounce, flare, or lob passes from anywhere on the basketball court to simulate virtually any game situation while operating on a rechargeable battery.

iMake is a shooting machine with touch pad programming. It uses a net collection system that captures both made and missed shots from underneath the basket and passes the ball out to the perimeter. 

Both machines can be used for individual or team training, have a wireless remote control, and can track shots taken, shots made and calculate shooting percentage with their wireless shots made counter. The Dr. Dish is used by universities across the United States and in 40 countries.

Spokespeople
 Dick Vitale - commentator/former coach
 Karch Kiraly - commentator/three-time Olympic Gold Medalist

References

Manufacturing companies based in Minneapolis
Sporting goods manufacturers of the United States